Shades is a piece of instrumental music composition performed by "The United Kingdom Symphony Orchestra", which was used in the UK as the theme music to the Crown Paints TV commercial advertisement in 1985. The musical composition made the UK Singles Chart, where it stayed for four weeks, peaking at number 68. The record label was "Food for Thought Records Limited".

The orchestra was conducted by Donald Gould. The record single was produced by songwriter and record producer David Mindel and François Trichot (the latter of whom also wrote and produced the B-side, titled 'Double Meaning').

The TV commercial starts with orchestra members walking in one by one dressed in coloured suits that reflect the colours by Crown Paints at the time called "Shades". As the TV advert progresses, the orchestra members start to play the music theme "Shades" and by the end, the whole orchestra is playing to conclusion.

External links
 SHADES (Theme from the Crown Paint Commercial), The United Kingdom Symphony Orchestra, Conducted by Donald Gould 

1985 singles
1985 songs